According to Inuit mythology Amaguq is a trickster and wolf god. See also: Amarok, the spirit of the wolf.  

Animal gods
Inuit gods
Mythological canines
Mythological dogs
Trickster gods
Wolves in folklore, religion and mythology